The Alumina Company of Guinea (ACG-Fria) is a bauxite mining company based in Fria, Guinea. They are the main aluminium producing company in the country, and was once part-owned by the government of Guinea in Conakry and by the Reynolds Metals Company of Richmond, Virginia, of the United States. However, in 2006 the president of Guinea, Lansana Conte signed an agreement with Russian giant, United Company RUSAL privatizing the bauxite and aluminum complex in Fria. This will allow for eventual doubling of the company's capacity.

External links
Mbendi.com

Mining companies of Guinea
Aluminium companies of Guinea
Rusal
Boké Region